Lehnert is a German surname. Notable people with the surname include:

Adolf Lehnert (1862–1948), German sculptor and medal designer
Andreas Lehnert, German clarinetist
Jürgen Lehnert (born 1954), East German sprint canoeist
Katharina Lehnert (born 1994), Filipino-German tennis player
Michael R. Lehnert, retired major general of the United States Marine Corps
Pascalina Lehnert (1894–1983), German Roman Catholic sister
Rudolf Franz Lehnert, photographer
Wendy Lehnert, American computer scientist

See also
Lehnert v. Ferris Faculty Association

German-language surnames